is a district located in Nagano Prefecture, Japan.

As of 2003, the district has an estimated population of 25,179 and a density of 59.50 persons per km2. The total area is 423.19 km2.

Towns and villages
Yamanouchi
Kijimadaira
Nozawaonsen

Districts in Nagano Prefecture